Nura Mohammed, also known as Mohammed Nur (born 2 December 2002) is a Nigerian international footballer who plays for Jigawa Golden Stars, as a striker.

Career
He has played club football for El-Kanemi Feeders, El-Kanemi Warriors, Kada City and Jigawa Golden Stars.

He made his international debut for Nigeria in 2018. Nur was selected for the 2018 African Nations Championship squad and made history as the youngest player to ever feature in the competition at the age of 15.

References

2002 births
Living people
Nigerian footballers
El-Kanemi Warriors F.C. players
Kada City F.C. players
Jigawa Golden Stars F.C. players
Association football forwards
Nigeria international footballers
Nigeria A' international footballers
2018 African Nations Championship players